Admiral Sir Robert Moorsom KCB (8 June 1760 – 14 April 1835) was an officer of the Royal Navy who served during the American War of Independence, the French Revolutionary Wars and the Napoleonic Wars. His very active service career was especially highlighted by his actions in 1805 at the battle of Trafalgar, where his ship HMS Revenge was severely damaged and Moorsom was himself seriously wounded.

Life
Born into a seagoing family at Whitby in Yorkshire in 1760, Moorsom was late to the navy, only joining aged 17, a good four years later than most of his contemporaries. He made up for his late arrival with exhaustive service, which included action at the Great Siege of Gibraltar and at the battle of Cape Spartel. He was made lieutenant rapidly in 1784 following commendations from an action against a French convoy to America two years before, and then profited by the buildup to war in 1790 when he was granted promotion to Post captain.

His service in the Revolutionary Wars was unremarkable, maintaining position in the blockading fleets of several ports where there was small opportunity for glory or action, especially in ships of the line, which he had soon graduated into. Following the Peace of Amiens, Moorsom took over the newly built Revenge and was placed under Admiral Collingwood's command in the Mediterranean, accompanying his admiral to Cadiz and thence to the battle of Trafalgar in October 1805.

At the battle, Revenge was situated far to the rear of Collingwood's division, but due to her recent construction she was a very fast and agile ship and thus was able to overtake two ships in front of her, aiming at the Spanish flagship Principe de Asturias but missing her and becoming embroiled in a duel with the smaller San Ildefonso which drifted off damaged. The Revenge next engaged the Achille and dismasted her leaving her vulnerable to attack from following ships who later sank her. The French Aigle was next, Revenge ramming her and damaging her so she too drifted off from action. Finally reaching the Principe de Asturias, the Revenge was dwarfed by her enormous opponent, and was significantly damaged by the broadsides from the bigger ship, splinters from which badly wounded Moorsom and killed or wounded over 70 of his crew. Asturias was later driven off by the aid of HMS Dreadnought and HMS Thunderer, who rescued the badly holed and slowly sinking Revenge.

By a miracle of seamanship, the Revenge was returned to Gibraltar despite the raging storm and Moorsom was one of the first officers dispatched home, sent to recuperate from his wounds. He was richly rewarded for his heroic actions in the battle but due to the surge in promotions which the battle brought combined with his injuries he was unable to find a ship and never returned to the sea as a captain. He was instead given numerous shore jobs, including carrying the great banner at Lord Nelson's funeral, appointment to rear-admiral and a position with the Lords of the Admiralty and following the end of the war a career in backbench politics (as MP for Queenborough 1812–1820), as Surveyor-General of the Ordnance. He went on to be Commander-in-Chief, Chatham in 1824 He was promoted through the flag ranks.

Robert Moorsom died peacefully in 1835 as a full Admiral of the Blue and a Knight Commander of the Order of the Bath and was buried at St Peter's Church, Cosgrove, Northamptonshire, where a memorial plaque to him and his wife Eleanor (sister of cotton milling entrepreneur Jonathan Scarth) can still be seen. Robert's legacy included his talent for poetry and drawing which he passed on to his two sons, Vice Admiral Constantine Richard Moorsom 1792-1861 and Captain William Scarth Moorsom, an early railway engineer. A descendant (via Constantine) is the English journalist Toby Young and Canadian journalist Richard Moorsom Harrison.

Further reading 
The Trafalgar Captains, Colin White and the 1805 Club, Chatham Publishing, London, 2005,

References

External links 
Animation of the Battle of Trafalgar
Moorsom House (WikiMapia)
 
 

|-

|-

1760 births
1835 deaths
People from Whitby
Royal Navy admirals
Members of the Parliament of the United Kingdom for English constituencies
Knights Commander of the Order of the Bath
Lords of the Admiralty
Royal Navy captains at the Battle of Trafalgar
Royal Navy personnel of the American Revolutionary War
Royal Navy personnel of the French Revolutionary Wars
Royal Navy personnel of the Napoleonic Wars
UK MPs 1812–1818
UK MPs 1818–1820
English Freemasons